Restless Days is the eighth studio album by Pittsburgh band The Clarks. It was released on June 9, 2009.

Track listing 
 "True Believer" (Blasey/Joseph)
 "Inside" (Blasey)
 "Trampoline" (Joseph)
 "Midnight Rose" (Blasey)
 "Soul and Skin" (Joseph)
 "Sunshine" (Blasey)
 "Come 'Round Here" (Joseph)
 "Restless Days" (Blasey)
 "The Clowns" (Joseph)
 "The Runaway" (Joseph)
 "In Between" (Joseph)
 "What a Wonderful World" (Thiele/Weiss)

Personnel 
 Scott Blasey - lead vocals, acoustic and electric guitars
 Rob James - electric guitars, vocals
 Greg Joseph - bass guitar, vocals
 Dave Minarik - drums and vocals
 Skip Sanders - keyboards
 Gary W. Jacob - pedal steel

References

2009 albums
The Clarks albums